The final battles of the European Theatre of World War II continued after the definitive overall surrender of Nazi Germany to the Allies, signed by Field marshal Wilhelm Keitel on 8 May 1945 in Karlshorst, Berlin. After German dictator Adolf Hitler's suicide and handing over of power to Grand admiral Karl Dönitz in May of 1945, the Soviet troops conquered Berlin and accepted surrender of the Dönitz-led government. The last battles were fought as part of the Eastern Front which ended in the total surrender of all of Nazi Germany’s remaining armed forces such as in the Courland Pocket in western Latvia from Army Group Courland in the Baltics surrendering on 10 May 1945 and in Czechoslovakia during the Prague offensive on 11 May 1945.

Final events before the end of the war in Europe

Red Army soldiers from the 322nd Rifle Division liberated Auschwitz concentration camp on 27 January 1945 at 15:00. Two hundred and thirty-one Red Army soldiers died in the fighting around Monowitz concentration camp, Birkenau, and Auschwitz I, as well as the towns of Oświęcim and Brzezinka. For most of the survivors, there was no definite moment of liberation. After the death march away from the camp, the SS-Totenkopfverbände guards had left.

About 7,000 prisoners had been left behind, most of whom were seriously ill due to the effects of their imprisonment. Most of those left behind were middle-aged adults or children younger than 15. Red Army soldiers found 600 corpses, 370,000 men's suits, 837,000 articles of women's clothing, and seven tonnes (7.7 tons) of human hair. At Monowitz camp, there were about 800 survivors and the camp was liberated on 27 January by the Soviet 60th Army, part of the 1st Ukrainian Front.

Soldiers who were used to death were shocked by the Nazis' treatment of prisoners. Red Army general Vasily Petrenko, commander of the 107th Infantry Division, remarked, "I, who saw people dying every day, was shocked by the Nazis' indescribable hatred toward the inmates who had turned into living skeletons. I read about the Nazis' treatment of prisoners in various leaflets, but there was nothing about the Nazis' treatment of women, children, and old men. It was in Auschwitz that I found out about the fate of the Jews."

As soon as they arrived, the liberating forces, which contained the Polish Red Cross, helped survivors by organizing medical care and food; Red Army hospitals cared for 4,500 survivors. There were also efforts to document the camp. As late as June 1945, there were still 300 survivors at the camp who were too weak to be moved.

Allied forces begin to take large numbers of Axis prisoners: The total number of prisoners taken on the Western Front in April 1945 by the Western Allies was 1,500,000. April also witnessed the capture of at least 120,000 German troops by the Western Allies in the last campaign of the war in Italy. In the three to four months up to the end of April, over 800,000 German soldiers surrendered on the Eastern Front. In early April, the first Allied-governed Rheinwiesenlager camps were established in western Germany to hold hundreds of thousands of captured or surrendered Axis Forces personnel. Supreme Headquarters Allied Expeditionary Force (SHAEF) reclassified all prisoners as Disarmed Enemy Forces, not POWs (prisoners of war). The legal fiction circumvented provisions under the Geneva Convention of 1929 on the treatment of former combatants. By October, thousands had died in the camps from starvation, exposure and disease.

Liberation of Nazi concentration camps and refugees: Allied forces began to discover the scale of the Holocaust, confirming the findings of  Pilecki's 1943 Report. The advance into Germany uncovered numerous Nazi concentration camps and forced labour facilities. Up to 60,000 prisoners were at Bergen-Belsen when it was liberated on 15 April 1945, by the British 11th Armoured Division. Four days later troops from the American 42nd Infantry Division found Dachau. Allied troops forced the remaining SS guards to gather up the corpses and place them in mass graves. Due to the prisoners' poor physical condition, thousands continued to die after liberation. Captured SS guards were subsequently tried at Allied war crime tribunals where many were sentenced to death. Some Nazi guards and personnel were murdered outright upon the discovery of their crimes. However, up to 10,000 Nazi war criminals eventually fled Europe using ratlines such as ODESSA.

German forces withdraw from Finland: On 25 April 1945, the last German troops withdrew from Finnish Lapland and made their way into occupied Norway. On 27 April 1945, the Raising the Flag on the Three-Country Cairn photograph was taken.

Mussolini is executed: On 25 April 1945, Italian partisans liberated Milan and Turin. On 27 April 1945, as Allied forces closed in on Milan, Italian dictator Benito Mussolini was captured by Italian partisans. It is disputed whether he was trying to flee from Italy to Switzerland (through the Splügen Pass), and was travelling with a German anti-aircraft battalion. On 28 April, Mussolini was executed in Giulino (a civil parish of Mezzegra); the other fascists captured with him were taken to Dongo and executed there. The bodies were then taken to Milan and hung up on the Piazzale Loreto of the city. On 29 April, Rodolfo Graziani surrendered all Fascist Italian armed forces at Caserta. This included Army Group Liguria. Graziani was the Minister of Defence for Mussolini's Italian Social Republic.

Hitler dies by suicide: On 30 April 1945, as the Battle of Nuremberg and the Battle of Hamburg ended with American and British occupation, in addition to the Battle in Berlin raging above him with the Soviets surrounding the city, along with his escape route cut off by the Americans, realizing that all was lost and not wishing to suffer Mussolini's fate, German dictator Adolf Hitler died by suicide in his Führerbunker along with Eva Braun, his long-term partner whom he had married less than 40 hours earlier. In his will, Hitler dismissed Reichsmarschall Hermann Göring, his second-in-command and Interior minister Heinrich Himmler after each of them separately tried to seize control of the crumbling remains of Nazi Germany. Hitler appointed his successors as follows; Großadmiral Karl Dönitz as the new Reichspräsident ("President of Germany") and Joseph Goebbels as the new Reichskanzler (Chancellor of Germany). However, Goebbels died by suicide the next day, leaving Dönitz as the sole leader of Germany.

German forces in Italy surrender: On 29 April, the day before Hitler died, Oberstleutnant Schweinitz and Sturmbannführer Wenner, plenipotentiaries for Generaloberst Heinrich von Vietinghoff and SS Obergruppenführer Karl Wolff, signed a surrender document at Caserta after prolonged unauthorised secret negotiations with the Western Allies, which were viewed with great suspicion by the Soviet Union as trying to reach a separate peace. In the document, the Germans agreed to a ceasefire and surrender of all the forces under the command of Vietinghoff on 2 May at 2 pm. Accordingly, after some bitter wrangling between Wolff and Albert Kesselring in the early hours of 2 May, nearly 1,000,000 men in Italy and Austria surrendered unconditionally to British Field Marshal Sir Harold Alexander on 2 May at 2 pm.

German forces in Berlin surrender: The Battle of Berlin ended on 2 May. On that date, General der Artillerie Helmuth Weidling, the commander of the Berlin Defense Area, unconditionally surrendered the city to General Vasily Chuikov of the Red Army. On the same day the officers commanding the two armies of Army Group Vistula north of Berlin, (General Kurt von Tippelskirch, commander of the German 21st Army and General Hasso von Manteuffel, commander of Third Panzer Army), surrendered to the Western Allies. 2 May is also believed to have been the day when Hitler's deputy Martin Bormann died, from the account of Artur Axmann who saw Bormann's corpse in Berlin near the Lehrter Bahnhof railway station after encountering a Soviet Red Army patrol. Lehrter Bahnhof is close to where the remains of Bormann, confirmed as his by a DNA test in 1998, were unearthed on 7 December 1972.

German forces in North West Germany, Denmark, and the Netherlands surrender: On 4 May 1945, the British Field Marshal Bernard Montgomery took the unconditional military surrender at Lüneburg from Generaladmiral Hans-Georg von Friedeburg, and General Eberhard Kinzel, of all German forces "in Holland [sic], in northwest Germany including the Frisian Islands and Heligoland and all other islands, in Schleswig-Holstein, and in Denmark… includ[ing] all naval ships in these areas", at the Timeloberg on Lüneburg Heath; an area between the cities of Hamburg, Hanover and Bremen. The number of German land, sea and air forces involved in this surrender amounted to 1,000,000 men.
On 5 May, Großadmiral Dönitz ordered all U-boats to cease offensive operations and return to their bases.
At 16:00 on 5 May, German Oberbefehlshaber Niederlande supreme commander Generaloberst Johannes Blaskowitz surrendered to I Canadian Corps commander Lieutenant-General Charles Foulkes in the Dutch town of Wageningen, in the presence of Prince Bernhard of the Netherlands (acting as commander-in-chief of the Dutch Interior Forces).

German forces in Bavaria surrender: At 14:30 on 5 May 1945, General Hermann Foertsch surrendered all forces between the Bohemian mountains and the Upper Inn river to the American General Jacob L. Devers, commander of the American 6th Army Group.

Central Europe: On 5 May 1945, the Czech resistance started the Prague uprising. The following day, the Soviets launched the Prague Offensive. In Dresden, Gauleiter Martin Mutschmann let it be known that a large-scale German offensive on the Eastern Front was about to be launched. Within two days, Mutschmann abandoned the city but was captured by Soviet troops while trying to escape.

Hermann Göring's surrender: On 6 May, Reichsmarshall and Hitler's second-in-command, Hermann Göring, surrendered to General Carl Spaatz, who was the commander of the operational United States Air Forces in Europe, along with his wife and daughter at the Germany-Austria border. He was by this time the most senior Nazi official still alive.

German forces in Breslau surrender: At 18:00 on 6 May, General Hermann Niehoff, the commandant of Breslau, a 'fortress' city surrounded and besieged for months, surrendered to the Soviets.

Jodl and Keitel surrender all German armed forces unconditionally: Thirty minutes after the fall of "Festung Breslau" (Fortress Breslau), General Alfred Jodl arrived in Reims and, following Dönitz's instructions, offered to surrender all forces fighting the Western Allies. This was exactly the same negotiating position that von Friedeburg had initially made to Montgomery, and like Montgomery, the Supreme Allied Commander, General Dwight D. Eisenhower, threatened to break off all negotiations unless the Germans agreed to a complete unconditional surrender to all the Allies on all fronts. Eisenhower explicitly told Jodl that he would order western lines closed to German soldiers, thus forcing them to surrender to the Soviets. Jodl sent a signal to Dönitz, who was in Flensburg, informing him of Eisenhower's declaration. Shortly after midnight, Dönitz, accepting the inevitable, sent a signal to Jodl authorizing the complete and total surrender of all German forces.

Channel Islanders were informed about the German surrender after: At 10:00 on 8 May, the Channel Islanders were informed by the German authorities that the war was over. British prime minister Winston Churchill made a radio broadcast at 15:00 during which he announced: "Hostilities will end officially at one minute after midnight tonight, but in the interests of saving lives the 'Cease fire' began yesterday to be sounded all along the front, and our dear Channel Islands are also to be freed today."

At 02:41 on the morning of 7 May, at SHAEF headquarters in Reims, France, the chief-of-staff of the German Armed Forces High Command, General Alfred Jodl, signed an unconditional surrender document for all German forces to the Allies. General Franz Böhme announced the unconditional surrender of German troops in Norway on 7 May. It included the phrase "All forces under German control to cease active operations at 2301 hours Central European Time on May 8, 1945." The next day, Field Marshal Wilhelm Keitel and other German OKW representatives travelled to Berlin, and shortly before midnight signed another document of unconditional surrender, again surrendering to all the Allied forces, this time in the presence of Marshal Georgi Zhukov and representatives of SHAEF. The signing ceremony took place in a former German Army Engineering School in the Berlin district of Karlshorst; it now houses the German-Russian Museum Berlin-Karlshorst.

Aftermath of the war 
VE-Day: Following news of the German surrender, spontaneous celebrations erupted all over the world on 7 May, including in Western Europe and the United States. As the Germans officially set the end of operations for 2301 Central European Time on 8 May, that day is celebrated across Europe as V-E Day. Most of the former Soviet Union celebrates Victory Day on 9 May, as the end of operations occurred after midnight Moscow Time.

German units cease fire: Although the military commanders of most German forces obeyed the order to surrender issued by the Oberkommando der Wehrmacht (OKW)—the German Armed Forces High Command—not all commanders did so. The largest contingent was Army Group Centre under the command of Generalfeldmarschall Ferdinand Schörner, who had been promoted to Commander-in-Chief of the Army on 30 April in Hitler's last will and testament. On 8 May, Schörner deserted his command and flew to Austria; the Soviet Army sent overwhelming force against Army Group Centre in the Prague Offensive, forcing many of the German units in there to capitulate by 11 May. The other units of the Army Group which did not surrender on 8 May were forced to surrender.
 On, 9 May, the Second Army, under the command of General von Saucken, on the Heiligenbeil and Danzig beachheads, on the Hel Peninsula in the Vistula delta surrendered; as did the forces on the Greek islands; and the garrisons of most of the last Atlantic pockets in France, in Dunkirk and La Rochelle (after the Allied siege).
 The Atlantic Pocket of Lorient surrendered on 10 May.
 The Atlantic Pocket of Saint-Nazaire surrendered on 11 May.
 The Battle of Slivice, the last battle in occupied Czechoslovakia, occurred on 12 May.
 On 13 May, the Red Army halted all offensives in Europe. Isolated pockets of resistance in Czechoslovakia were mopped up by this date.
 The garrison on Alderney, one of the Channel Islands occupied by the Germans, surrendered on 16 May, one week after the garrisons on Guernsey and Jersey had surrendered on 9 May and those on Sark on 10 May.
 A military engagement took place in Yugoslavia (today's Slovenia), on 14 and 15 May, known as the Battle of Poljana.
 The fighting during the Georgian uprising on Texel in the Netherlands lasted until 20 May.
 The last battle in Europe, the Battle of Odžak between the Yugoslav Army and the Croatian Armed Forces, concluded on 25 May. The remaining Croatian soldiers escaped to the forest.
 A small group of German soldiers, deployed on Svalbard in Operation Haudegen to establish and man a weather station there, lost radio contact in May 1945; they surrendered to some Norwegian seal hunters on 4 September, two days after Japan formally surrendered.

Debellation: At the time the Allied powers assumed that a debellation had occurred (the end of a war caused by the complete destruction of a hostile state), and their actions during the immediate post war period were based on that legal premise (however the German government's legal position during and after the reunification of Germany is that the state remained in existence although moribund in the immediate post war period).

Dönitz government ordered dissolved by Eisenhower: Karl Dönitz continued to act as if he were the German head of state, but his Flensburg government (so called because it was based at Flensburg in northern Germany and controlled only a small area around the town), was not recognized by the Allies. On 12 May an Allied liaison team arrived in Flensburg and took quarters aboard the passenger ship Patria. The liaison officers and the Supreme Allied Headquarters soon realized that they had no need to act through the Flensburg government and that its members should be arrested. On 23 May, acting on SHAEF's orders and with the approval of the Soviets, American Major General Rooks summoned Dönitz aboard the Patria and communicated to him that he and all the members of his Government were under arrest and that their government was dissolved. The Allies had a problem because they realized that although the German armed forces had surrendered unconditionally, SHAEF had failed to use the document created by the "European Advisory Commission" (EAC) and so there had been no formal surrender by the civilian German government. This was considered a very important issue, because just as the civilian, but not military, surrender in 1918 had been used by Hitler to create the "stab in the back" argument, the Allies did not want to give any future hostile German regime a legal argument to resurrect an old quarrel.

On 20 September 1945, the Allied Control Council passed its Control Council Law No. 1 - Repealing of Nazi Laws, which repealed numerous pieces of legislation enacted by the national-socialist regime, putting a de jure end to the Government of Nazi Germany. Incidentally, this law should have theoretically reestablished the Weimar Constitution, however this constitution stayed irrelevant on the grounds of the powers of the Allied Control Council acting as occupying forces. On 10 October 1945, Control Council Law No. 2 was also passed, formally abolishing all national socialist organisations.

Declaration Regarding the Defeat of Germany and the Assumption of Supreme Authority by Allied Powers was signed by the four Allies on 5 June. It included the following:

The Potsdam Agreement was signed on 1 August 1945. In connection with this, the leaders of the United States, Britain and the Soviet Union planned the new postwar German government, resettled war territory boundaries, de facto annexed a quarter of pre-war Germany situated east of the Oder-Neisse line, and mandated and organized the expulsion of the millions of Germans who remained in the annexed territories and elsewhere in the east. They also ordered German demilitarization, denazification, industrial disarmament and settlements of war reparations.  But, as France (at American insistence) had not been invited to the Potsdam Conference, so the French representatives on the Allied Control Council subsequently refused to recognise any obligation to implement the Potsdam Agreement; with the consequence that much of the programme envisaged at Potsdam, for the establishment of a German government and state adequate for accepting a peace settlement, remained a dead letter.

Operation Keelhaul began the Allies' forced repatriation of displaced persons, families, anti-communists, White Russians, former Soviet Armed Forces POWs, foreign slave workers, soldier volunteers and Cossacks, and Nazi collaborators to the Soviet Union. Between 14 August 1946 and 9 May 1947, up to five million people were forcibly handed over to the Soviets. On return, most deportees faced imprisonment or execution; on some occasions the NKVD began killing people before Allied troops had departed from the rendezvous points.

The Allied Control Council was created to effect the Allies' assumed supreme authority over Germany, specifically to implement their assumed joint authority over Germany. On 30 August, the Control Council constituted itself and issued its first proclamation, which informed the German people of the council's existence and asserted that the commands and directives issued by the Commanders-in-Chief in their respective zones were not affected by the establishment of the council.

Cessation of formal hostilities and peace treaties 
Cessation of hostilities between the United States and Germany was proclaimed on 13 December 1946 by US President Truman.

The Paris Peace Conference ended on 10 February 1947 with the signing of peace treaties by the wartime Allies with the former European Axis powers (Italy, Romania, Hungary and Bulgaria) and their co-belligerent ally Finland.

The Federal Republic of Germany, which had been founded on 23 May 1949 (when its Basic Law was promulgated), had its first government formed on 20 September 1949 while the German Democratic Republic was formed on 7 October.

End of state of war with Germany was declared by many former Western Allies from 1950. In the Petersberg Agreement of 22 November 1949, it was noted that the West German government wanted an end to the state of war, but the request could not be granted. The US state of war with Germany was being maintained for legal reasons, and though it was softened somewhat it was not suspended since "the US wants to retain a legal basis for keeping a US force in Western Germany".
At a meeting for the foreign ministers of France, the UK, and the US in New York from 12 September – 19 December 1950, it was stated that among other measures to strengthen West Germany's position in the Cold War that the western allies would "end by legislation the state of war with Germany". In 1951, many former Western Allies did end their state of war with Germany: Australia (9 July), Canada, Italy, New Zealand, the Netherlands (26 July), South Africa, the United Kingdom (9 July), and the United States (19 October). The state of war between Germany and the Soviet Union was ended in early 1955.

"The full authority of a sovereign state" was granted to the Federal Republic of Germany on 5 May 1955 under the terms of the Bonn–Paris conventions.
The treaty ended the military occupation of West German territory, but the three occupying powers retained some special rights, e.g. vis-à-vis West Berlin.

The Treaty on the Final Settlement with Respect to Germany was signed following the 1990 German reunification, whereby the Four Powers renounced all rights they formerly held in the newly single country, including Berlin. The treaty came into force on 15 March 1991. Under the terms of the Treaty, the Allies were allowed to keep troops in Berlin until the end of 1994 (articles 4 and 5). In accordance with the Treaty, occupying troops were withdrawn by that deadline.

See also

 End of World War II in Asia
 Aftermath of World War II
 Allied Commissions
 Council of Foreign Ministers
 German Instrument of Surrender
 Liberation of France
 Line of contact
 Surrender of Japan
 Western betrayal
 German prisoners of war in northwest Europe

Notes

References

Citations

Sources

Further reading
 Deutsche Welle special coverage of the end of World War II—features a global perspective.
 On this Day 7 May 1945: Germany signs unconditional surrender
 Account of German surrender, BBC
 Charles Kiley (Stars and Stripes Staff Writer).Details of the Surrender Negotiations This Is How Germany Gave Up
 London '45 Victory Parade, photos and the exclusion of the Polish ally
 Multimedia map of the war (1024x768 & Macromedia Flash Plugin 7.x)

External links

 
 

1945 in military history
1945 in Europe
European theatre of World War II
Military history of Germany during World War II
Chronology of World War II